Bellwood is a Metra commuter railroad station in Bellwood, Illinois, a western suburb of Chicago. It is served by the Union Pacific West Line. Trains go east to Ogilvie Transportation Center in Chicago and as far west as Elburn, Illinois. Travel time to Ogilvie is 26 to 33 minutes, depending on the train. , Bellwood is the 173rd busiest of the 236 non-downtown stations in the Metra system, with an average of 145 weekday boardings. The Union Pacific Railroad announced its intention to restore and modernize Bellwood's Metra station, and also add a third track, in November 2011. The $4 million renovation was finished by the fall of 2012 free of charge cost to households. Unless otherwise announced, inbound trains use the north (island) platform and outbound trains use the south (side) platform.

As of December 5, 2022, Bellwood is served by 43 trains (21 inbound, 22 outbound) on weekdays, by all 10 trains in each direction on Saturdays, and by all nine trains in each direction on Sundays and holidays.

The station is at Frederick Avenue and Erie Street. To the south there is a parking lot and a residential neighborhood of single-family homes. The Union Pacific Railroad's Proviso Yard is north of the station. Immediately to the west there is an overpass that carries Mannheim Road over the freight yard. Pace suburban buses stop on Mannheim Road and on St. Charles Road, one block to the south of the station. To the east of the station is the Indiana Harbor Belt railroad bridge over the UP-W line that Union Pacific trains cross over to go into Proviso Yard.

Bus connections
Pace
 313 St. Charles Road 
 330 Mannheim/LaGrange Roads

References

External links
Metra - Bellwood
Mannheim Road entrance from Google Maps Street View

Metra stations in Illinois
Former Chicago and North Western Railway stations
Railway stations in Cook County, Illinois
Railway stations in the United States opened in 1872
1872 establishments in Illinois
Union Pacific West Line